Düsseldorf-Garath is a railway station situated at Garath, Düsseldorf in western Germany. It is served by the S6 and S68 lines of the Rhine-Ruhr S-Bahn.

References 

Railway stations in Düsseldorf
Railway stations in Germany opened in 1967
Rhine-Ruhr S-Bahn stations
S6 (Rhine-Ruhr S-Bahn)
S68 (Rhine-Ruhr S-Bahn)